Sk Samroj Ajmi Alvi, is a Bangladeshi actress and model. She became nationally known in 2007 when she finished as the first runner up in the Lux Channel I Superstar beauty pageant.

Selected TV appearance

Awards and nominations
 Lux Channel I Superstar - 2007: First runner-up, RTV Star award, Bachosus award, binodon bichitra award,  TRAB award, Babisus award, Shako telefilm award etc

References

Living people
Bangladeshi television actresses
21st-century Bangladeshi actresses
Year of birth missing (living people)